"Lady" is a 2014 song by the American singer/songwriter Stevie Nicks. It was the second single from her solo album 24 Karat Gold: Songs from the Vault. Nicks shot a music video on July 28, 2014. It was released on September 4, 2014. Nicks said the song is the first song she ever wrote on a piano.

The music video was well received, and has over 1,000,872 views to date.

References

External links
stevienicksofficial.com
stevienicks2014.blogspot.com
http://www.fleetwoodmacnews.com/p/stevie-nicks_10.html

Stevie Nicks songs
2014 songs
2014 singles
Songs written by Stevie Nicks